Kevin James Smith (born 20 March 1987) is a Scottish professional footballer who plays forward for Bonnyrigg Rose Athletic. He has previously played for Leeds United, Sunderland, Dundee United, Notts County, Queen of the South, Dumbarton and East Fife, and has also appeared for Wrexham, Dundee and Raith Rovers on loan.

Background
Born in Edinburgh, Kevin Smith attended Musselburgh Grammar School. He was selected for the Lothian Schools XI in 2002.

Career
Smith began his career with Leeds United, but was allowed to leave and signed for Sunderland in January 2006. He had loan spells with Wrexham and Dundee but could not break into Sunderland's first team and was released in June 2007 after eighteen months at the club.

After a lengthy period without a club, Smith began training with Dundee United in April 2008. He appeared as an unused substitute in the final two matches of the season and subsequently signed a one-year contract.

In July 2008, six days after appearing against them in a friendly, Smith undertook a five-month loan spell with Raith Rovers, scoring in his second match for the club. Smith was recalled from his loan spell in January 2009 after scoring 12 goals in 17 appearances for Raith; however, on 23 January 2009 he was allowed to return to the Kirkcaldy club until the end of the season. In April 2009, after helping Raith to top of the table with three games remaining, Smith suffered a broken leg and dislocated ankle, ruling him out for six months. Following his recovery from this injury he was loaned to Raith for a third time as he sought to recover his match fitness. He helped Rovers to that season's Scottish Second Division Championship.

He then moved to League One Notts County after signing a one-year deal on 2 August 2010.

It was announced on 25 June 2011, along with ex-Raith colleague Mark Campbell, that he had agreed terms but not yet signed for Dumfries club Queen of the South. His Queens debut was on 23 July 2011 the extra time 2–0 defeat away at Ayr United in the 2011–12 Scottish Challenge Cup.

Career statistics

Honours
Raith Rovers

Scottish Second Division: 1
 2008–09

Queen of the South

Scottish Second Division: 1
2012–13

Scottish Challenge Cup: 1
2012–13

References

External links

 (Raith stats due to Soccerbase error)

Living people
1987 births
Footballers from Edinburgh
Scottish footballers
Leeds United F.C. players
Sunderland A.F.C. players
Wrexham A.F.C. players
Dundee F.C. players
Dundee United F.C. players
Notts County F.C. players
Raith Rovers F.C. players
English Football League players
Scottish Football League players
Association football forwards
Wallsend Boys Club players
Queen of the South F.C. players
Dumbarton F.C. players
East Fife F.C. players
Scottish Professional Football League players
People educated at Musselburgh Grammar School
Bonnyrigg Rose Athletic F.C. players